Kiswarani Q'asa (Aymara kiswara Buddleja incana, -ni a suffix to indicate ownership, kiswarani "the one with kiswara",  Quechua q'asa mountain pass, "Kiswarani mountain pass" or "mountain pass with kiswara", Hispanicized spelling Quisuaraniccasa) is a mountain  in the Andes of Peru. The mountain is located in the Cusco Region, Espinar Province, Coporaque District.

Kiswarani Q'asa lies on a long ridge which extents from west to east along the river Kirwamayu (Querhuamayo) south of it. Kiswarani (Quishuarani) is the name of a stream which flows from the ridge down to Kirwamayu. The peaks east of Kiswarani Q'asa are named Wamanwachana (Huamanhuachana) and Kirwa (Querhua).

References 

Mountains of Peru
Mountains of Cusco Region